USS PGM-1 was a PGM-1 class motor gunboat that served in the United States Navy during World War II.

History
She was originally laid down as an SC-497 class submarine chaser on 29 November 1941, by the Peterson Boat Works in Sturgeon Bay, Wisconsin and launched on 27 June 1942. She was commissioned as SC-644 on 16 October 1942.

She was later converted to a PGM-1 class motor gunboat and renamed PGM-1 on 10 December 1943. PGM-1 received one battle star for action in the Northern Solomon Islands on 15 June 1944.

After the war she was transferred to the Foreign Liquidations Commission on 20 May 1947.  Her exact fate is unknown.

References
Motor Gunboat/Patrol Gunboat Photo Archive: PGM-1
USS SC-644 (SC-644)
see PGM-3 for service details

PGM-1-class motor gunboats
Ships built in Sturgeon Bay, Wisconsin
1942 ships
World War II gunboats of the United States